Stack may refer to:

Places
 Stack Island, an island game reserve in Bass Strait, south-eastern Australia, in Tasmania’s Hunter Island Group
 Blue Stack Mountains, in Co. Donegal, Ireland

People
 Stack (surname) (including a list of people with the name)
 Parnell "Stacks" Edwards, a key associate in the Lufthansa heist
 Robert Stack Pierce (1933–2016), an American actor and baseball player
 Brian "Stack" Stevens (1941–2017), a Cornish rugby player

Arts, entertainment, and media
 Stack magazine, a bimonthly publication about high school sports
 Stacks (album), a 2005 album by Bernie Marsden
 Stacks, trailer parks that were made vertical, in the film Ready Player One

Computing
 Stack (abstract data type), abstract data type and data structure based on the principle of last in first out
 Stack (Haskell), a tool to build Haskell projects and manage their dependencies
 Stack in Macintosh, one of a collection of documents created with HyperCard (as in a stack of virtual cards)
 Stack in LiveCode, one of a collection of program scripts created with LiveCode's Transcript programming language
 Call stack, stack data structure that stores information about the active subroutines of a computer program
 Protocol stack, a particular software implementation of a computer networking protocol suite
 Solution stack, a group of software systems, increasing in abstraction from bottom to top
 Stack-based memory allocation, a memory allocation scheme based on the principle of "last in, first out" 
 Stacks (Mac OS), a folder view on the Dock of macOS
 Stacks blockchain, a Bitcoin smart contract platform

Science and technology
 Stack (geology), a large vertical column of rock in the sea
 Stack (mathematics), a sheaf that takes values in categories rather than sets
 Algebraic stack, a special kind of stack commonly used in algebraic geometry
Stacks Project, an open source collaborative mathematics textbook writing project
 Stacking (chemistry), or pi stacking, attractive, noncovalent interactions between aromatic rings
 Yellow stackhousia, a plant
The Stack, a political and design theory of planetary-scale computation coined by Benjamin H. Bratton
 Stack, an assembled multistage rocket

Transportation
 Operation Stack, parking lorries on the M20 in Kent, England, when Channel crossings are disrupted
 Stack interchange, a free-flowing grade-separated junction between two roads
 The Stack, the interchange of I-10 and I-17 in Phoenix, Arizona

Other uses
 Stack Ltd, the company that owns 0verflow
 Stack (unit), a US unit of volume for stacked firewood
 Amp stack, of guitar amplifiers
 Library stack,  compactly spaced bookshelves in libraries
 Smoke stack or chimney
 Flue-gas stack, the industrial terminology for an industrial plant chimney
 Funnel (ship), the smokestack or chimney on a ship
 Stack effect, the movement of air into and out of buildings, chimneys, flue-gas stacks, or other containers

See also
 
 
 Haystack (disambiguation)
 Stacker (disambiguation)
 Stacking (disambiguation)
 Stak (disambiguation)